Ivan Pedersen  (born April 22, 1950) is a Danish composer.

Discography

With McKinleys
 1973: Pick Up Passion
 1977: McKinleys
 1978: Ballroom Heroes
 1979: New Shoes for the Old Suit
 1980: Robin Hood
 1993: McKinleys 16 Hits
 1993: McKinleys 16 Hits Vol. 2

With Laban
 1982: Laban
 1983: Laban 2
 1984: Laban 3
 1985: Laban's bedste
 1985: Laban 4
 1986: Caught by surprise
 1987: Laban 5
 1987: Roulette
 1988: Greatest hits
 1997: De største narrestreger
 2009: De 36 bedste narrestreger
 2010: Komplet & rariteter

With Backseat
 1992: Wind Me Up
 1994: Long Distance 
 1995: Hit Home 
 1996: Songs 
 1998: Shut Up and Play
 2007: Globalization

Solo
 2001: Monogram
 2004: Udenfor nummer men venlig stemt
 2006: Memo - 40 års jubilæumsbox

See also
List of Danish composers

References
Official homepage

Danish composers
Male composers
1950 births
Living people